"Choke" is a song by American rock duo I Dont Know How But They Found Me. It was originally released independently on October 26, 2017. The song was written and produced by bassist and vocalist Dallon Weekes. On August 24, 2018, the duo re-released "Choke" alongside a new song titled "Do It All The Time" as a double A-side single for their debut EP 1981 Extended Play (2018), marking their first release under Fearless Records.

Background
After the singles "Modern Day Cain" and "Nobody Likes the Opening Band" were released, the duo announced that a new single would be released.

Music video
The music video for the song was released on January 11, 2019, and was directed by Raúl Gonzo. The video shows the duo in a "short-lived music television program that aired briefly in Eastern Europe in the early 1980s". Currently the music video has a bit more than 2 million views, but the lyric video has more than 40 million views on YouTube.

Charts

Certifications

References

2017 songs
2017 singles
Songs written by Dallon Weekes
I Dont Know How But They Found Me songs
Fearless Records singles